This is a list of hospitals in the London Borough of Richmond upon Thames.

Current hospitals
 Barnes Hospital – managed by South West London and St George's Mental Health NHS Trust, it provides community and inpatient mental health services
 Cassel Hospital, Ham – a psychiatric hospital run by the West London NHS Trust
 Richmond Royal Hospital, Richmond – a mental health facility operated by South West London and St George's Mental Health NHS Trust
 Teddington Memorial Hospital – a community hospital operated by Hounslow and Richmond Community Healthcare NHS Trust

Former hospitals
 Normansfield Hospital – a facility for patients with an intellectual disability

References

Hospitals in Richmond upon Thames
Rich
Lists of places in London